Blood Oaths of the New Blues is the fourteenth studio album by American musician Wooden Wand, aka James Jackson Toth. It was released in January 2013 under Fire Records.

Track list

References

External links
Blood Oaths of the New Blues by Wooden Wand at iTunes.com

2013 albums
Fire Records (UK) albums